Gymnelia abdominalis is a moth of the subfamily Arctiinae. It was described by Rothschild in 1931. It is found in Brazil (Amazonas).

References

 Natural History Museum Lepidoptera generic names catalog

Gymnelia
Moths described in 1931